"Tearing" is a 1992 single by the American rock band Rollins Band, from the album The End of Silence.

Cover versions
The song was covered 28 times by Pearl Jam from 1992 to 1994.

CD single track listing
 "Tearing (Edit)" - 5:18
 "Ghost Rider" - 10:15
 "Earache My Eye" - 3:08
 "(there'll be no) Next Time (live)" - 7:12

Charts

References

Rollins Band songs
1992 singles
1992 songs